Arantzazu Azpiroz (born 1 September 1981) is a road cyclist from Spain. She represented her nation at the 2002 and 2007 UCI Road World Championships.

References

External links
 profile at Procyclingstats.com

1981 births
Spanish female cyclists
Living people
Place of birth missing (living people)
People from Tolosaldea
Sportspeople from Gipuzkoa
Cyclists from the Basque Country (autonomous community)